|}

This is a list of House of Assembly results for the 1969 Tasmanian election.

Results by division

Bass

Braddon

Denison

Franklin

Wilmot

See also 

 1969 Tasmanian state election
 Members of the Tasmanian House of Assembly, 1969–1972
 Candidates of the 1969 Tasmanian state election

References 

Results of Tasmanian elections